Abernyte is a small village in Perth and Kinross in Scotland.

Geography

Buildings
The village has a heritage organisation, the Abernyte Heritage Group, which was formed in 1988. The group was formed by a mixture of  longstanding residents and more recent arrivals to Abernyte and was part of a drive to maintain and celebrate the village's distinct local identity.  The group undertook an oral history project in 1996, which is now held at the archives at the University of Dundee.

The history of Abernyte in the nineteenth and early twentieth centuries is documented in Abernyte: The Quiet Revolution, which was written by Dr Mary Young and the Abernyte Heritage Group and published in 2008.

Between 1961 and 1991, the village was the location of a Royal Observer Corps monitoring bunker. It remains intact.

Education
The village has a small primary school with eight pupils. The proposed closing of the school in 2020 was postponed until 2021.

The parish church is part of the Abernyte linked with Inchture and Kinnaird linked with Longforgan grouping of churches.

Census
In 2001, the population was 106 and had risen to 116 in 2011.

Tragedy
A light aircraft crashed in poor visibility close to Abernyte in the early afternoon of 3 May 2015. Both men on board died. The wreckage was found on a hilltop at Outfield Farm next to Pitmiddle Wood between Abernyte and Kinnaird. The plane had left Inverness airport heading for Dundee airport.

References

External links

Abernyte Community Website

Villages in Perth and Kinross
Aviation accidents and incidents locations in Scotland